SRQ or srq may refer to:

 Sarasota–Bradenton International Airport, by IATA code, Sarasota County, Florida
 South East Asian Airlines (SEAir), by ICAO code, Philippines
 Sirionó language, by ISO 639 code, spoken in Bolivia
 SRQ, a service request command in the IEEE-488 specification